Tallon Griekspoor was the defending champion but chose not to defend his title.

Alexander Shevchenko won the title after defeating Riccardo Bonadio 6–3, 7–5 in the final.

Seeds

Draw

Finals

Top half

Bottom half

References

External links
Main draw
Qualifying draw

Bratislava Open - 1